Nogales High School may refer to:

 Nogales High School (Nogales, Arizona)
 Nogales High School (La Puente, California)